Annelie Enochson (born 29 October 1953) is a Swedish Christian Democratic politician and architect. She has been a member of the Riksdag since 2000. In the Riksdag, she has been part of the former Committee on Housing (2000–2002), the Committee on the Labour Market and the Committee on European Union Affairs (2002–2006). She also served as a regular member of the OSCE-delegation between 2002–2006 and is now a deputy member. After the election 2006, Annelie is her party's spokeswoman in traffic-related issues and a regular member of the Committee on the Transport and Communications. She also continues to serve in the OSCE-delegation.

The political focus of Annelie Enochson is concentrated to three issues; freedom of speech and religion in Sweden and internationally, compassion for the less fortunate, and the local issues of Gothenburg and its progress.

With a background in Gothenburg and the local development of the city, Enochson has several times by motions and interpellations pointed out the infrastructural jams that interfere with the growth of the city.

Through her international experiences, Enochson has in close proximity felt the consequences of the lack of freedoms in religion and speech. The parliamentary work of Enochson has repeatedly addressed these issues in countries like Turkey, Belarus, Iraq and the surrounding Middle East as a region.

Minorities in China were given much media when Enochson nominated the Uighur champion of human rights Rebeiya Kadéer for the Nobel Peace Prize in 2007. In April 2008, Enochson hosted a visit by Kadéer that rendered much attention in the Swedish media. Enochson is also a known friend of Israel and chairwoman of the chapter of the Sweden-Israel Friendship Association in West Sweden. In May 2008 Enochson was awarded the Jerusalem-price by the World Zionist Federation for her work in support of the nation of Israel.

Enochson put forth a motion on “Abducted Children” in the Parliament in 2006. Her motion described how children in custody battles are kidnapped by their parents and brought abroad.

References

External links
Annelie Enochson at the Riksdag website

1953 births
21st-century Swedish women politicians
Living people
Members of the Riksdag 1998–2002
Members of the Riksdag 2002–2006
Members of the Riksdag 2006–2010
Members of the Riksdag 2010–2014
Members of the Riksdag from the Christian Democrats (Sweden)
Women members of the Riksdag